McGilligan is a surname. Notable people with the surname include:

Brian McGilligan (born 1963), Irish hurler and Gaelic footballer
Janak Palta McGilligan, Indian social worker
Patrick McGilligan (Fine Gael politician) (1889–1979), Irish lawyer and politician
Patrick McGilligan (biographer), American writer
Patrick McGilligan (Irish nationalist politician) (1847–1917), Irish nationalist politician